The women's freestyle 51 kg is a competition featured at the 2013 European Wrestling Championships, and was held at the Tbilisi Sports Palace in Tbilisi, Georgia on 20 March 2013.

Medalists

(*) Romanian original silver medallist Estera Dobre was disqualified after her doping sample had been tested positive in August 2013.

Results
Legend
F — Won by fall

Main Draw

Repechage

References

2013 European Wrestling Championships